Emyln Elisabeth Morinelli McFarland is a New York-based American actress and comedian, who has provided voices for several prominent anime titles and has also provided voice work in television commercials.

Career
McFarland has provided various voices for many characters in anime, including the Pokémon series where she voiced Officer Jenny and Zoey, and the Odex Singaporean English dub of One Piece, where she voiced Tony Tony Chopper.

McFarland has also provided voice overs in many television commercials and promos, including Hanes, Revlon, Trip Advisor, Royal Caribbean, Dunkin' Donuts and Nintendo.

Outside of voice acting, she has also performed in various theater productions and has also studied and performed in improv and sketch comedy.

Personal life
McFarland is married and has two daughters, Adelaide and Isabelle.

Filmography

Live action

Anime

Animation

References

External links 
 

 
 

American voice actresses
Living people
Year of birth missing (living people)
American women comedians
Place of birth missing (living people)
21st-century American women